The Whitneyan North American Stage on the geologic timescale is the North American  faunal stage according to the North American Land Mammal Ages chronology (NALMA), typically set from 33,300,000 to 30,800,000 years BP, a period of  . It is usually considered to fall within the Early Oligocene. The Whitneyan is preceded by the Orellan and followed by the Arikareean NALMA stages.

The Whitneyan is interchangeable with the Rupelian age.

References

 
Oligocene life
Oligocene animals of North America